Ricardo García (1921 – 14 April 1981) was a Mexican modern pentathlete. He competed at the 1948 Summer Olympics.

References

1921 births
1981 deaths
Mexican male modern pentathletes
Sportspeople from Morelia
Olympic modern pentathletes of Mexico
Modern pentathletes at the 1948 Summer Olympics
20th-century Mexican people